Haplogonaria is a genus of worms belonging to the family Haploposthiidae.

The genus has almost cosmopolitan distribution.

Species

Species:

Haplogonaria amarilla 
Haplogonaria arenaria 
Haplogonaria baki

References

Acoelomorphs